Nishnabotna River Bridge may refer to:

Nishnabotna River Bridge (Henderson, Iowa), listed on the National Register of Historic Places in Mills County, Iowa
Nishnabotna River Bridge (310th Street), listed on the National Register of Historic Places in Crawford County, Iowa
Nishnabotna River Bridge (T Avenue), listed on the National Register of Historic Places in Crawford County, Iowa